Tatyana Viktorovna Zrazhevskaya is a Russian professional boxer who has held the WBC interim female bantamweight title since March 2021.

Professional career
Zrazhevskaya made her professional debut on 4 July 2016, scoring a fourth-round technical knockout victory against Olga Zabavina at the Korston Club in Moscow, Russia.

After compiling a record of 6–0 (2 KOs), she defeated Gabriella Busa via ten-round unanimous decision (UD) on 16 June 2018, capturing the WBC Silver female super-bantamweight title at the Ballhaus Forum in Munich, Germany. Two judges scored the bout 100–91 and the third judge scored it 100–90.

Following three more victories she defeated Estrella Valverde via ten-round UD on 27 March 2021, capturing the vacant WBC interim female bantamweight title at the RCC Boxing Academy in Yekaterinburg, Russia. Two judges scored the bout 100–90 and the third scored it 100–91.

Professional boxing record

References

External links

Living people
1992 births
Sportspeople from Voronezh
Russian women boxers
People from Turkistan Region
Russian expatriate sportspeople in Kazakhstan
Bantamweight boxers
Super-bantamweight boxers